In molecular biology, BAG domains are protein domains found in proteins which are modulators of chaperone activity, they bind to HSP70/HSC70 proteins and promote substrate release. The proteins have anti-apoptotic activity and increase the anti-cell death function of BCL-2 induced by various stimuli. BAG-1 binds to the serine/threonine kinase Raf-1 or Hsc70/Hsp70 in a mutually exclusive interaction. BAG-1 promotes cell growth by binding to and stimulating Raf-1 activity. The binding of Hsp70 to BAG-1 diminishes Raf-1 signalling and inhibits subsequent events, such as DNA synthesis, as well as arrests the cell cycle. BAG-1 has been suggested to function as a molecular switch that encourages cells to proliferate in normal conditions but become quiescent under a stressful environment .

BAG-family proteins contain a single BAG domain, except for human BAG-5 which has four BAG repeats. The BAG domain is a conserved region located at the C terminus of the BAG-family proteins that binds the ATPase domain of Hsc70/Hsp70. The BAG domain is evolutionarily conserved, and BAG domain containing proteins have been described and/or proven in a variety of organisms including Mus musculus (Mouse), Xenopus spp., Drosophila spp., Bombyx mori (Silk moth), Caenorhabditis elegans, Saccharomyces cerevisiae (Baker's yeast), Schizosaccharomyces pombe (Fission yeast), and Arabidopsis thaliana (Mouse-ear cress).

The BAG domain has 110-124 amino acids and is composed of three anti-parallel alpha-helices, each approximately 30-40 amino acids in length. The first and second helices interact with the serine/threonine kinase Raf-1 and the second and third helices are the sites of the BAG domain interaction with the ATPase domain of Hsc70/Hsp70. Binding of the BAG domain to the ATPase domain is mediated by both electrostatic and hydrophobic interactions in BAG-1 and is energy requiring.

References

Protein families